Judi Connelli AM (born 20 July 1947) is an Australian singer and actress in theatre, opera and television.

Connelli is best known for her career in opera and stage musicals. 

As a singer she has starred in performable with the Sydney Symphony Orchestra and the Melbourne Symphony Orchestra and also internationally in New York and the United Kingdom.

Career
Connelli is also known for her television soap operas such roles most especially The Young Doctors, in which she played regular Annemarie Austin from 1977 to 1978 and Prisoner playing 'Cookie', in episodes originally aired in 1982.

Connelli's  work includes leading theatre roles with Opera Australia in The Rake's Progress (Mother Goose), The Mikado (Katisha), Fiddler on the Roof (Golda), The Merry Widow (Zozo), Sweeney Todd (Mrs. Lovett) and The Gondoliers (Duchess of Plaza-Toro).

Other productions include Into the Woods (The Witch), The Threepenny Opera (Mrs. Peachum), Chicago (Matron Mama Morton), The Pack of Women, Jerry's Girls and Cabaret (Fraulein Schneider).

In concert she has appeared in Sunset Boulevard (Norma Desmond), Gypsy (Mamma Rose), Australia's Leading Ladies, Follies, Showstoppers, Candide and The 3 Divas.

Honours
In 2004, she was made a Member of the Order of Australia (AM) by the Queen of Australia for services to theatre and charity.

Discography

Solo albums

Cast albums and soundtracks 
 Chicago - original Australian cast (1981)
 The Pack of Women (1986)
 The Money or the Gun - Stairways to Heaven (1992)
 Once In A Blue Moon - A celebration of Australian musicals (1994)
 Perfect Strangers (with Suzanne Johnston) (1999)
 Mary Poppins - original Australian cast (2010)

Awards

ARIA Music Awards
The ARIA Music Awards is an annual ceremony presented by Australian Recording Industry Association (ARIA), which recognise excellence, innovation, and achievement across all genres of the music of Australia. They commenced in 1987.

! 
|-
| 1999|| Perfect Strangers (with Suzanne Johnston) || ARIA Award for Best Original Soundtrack, Cast or Show Album ||  ||rowspan="2" |  
|-
| 2002|| Back to Before || Best Cast or Show Album ||

Mo Awards
The Australian Entertainment Mo Awards (commonly known informally as the Mo Awards), were annual Australian entertainment industry awards. They recognise achievements in live entertainment in Australia from 1975 to 2016. Judi Connelli won four awards in that time.
 (wins only)
|-
| 1991
| Judi Connelli 
| Female Musical Theatre Performer of the Year
| 
|-
| 1993
| Judi Connelli 
| Female Musical Theatre Performer of the Year
| 
|-
| 2001
| Judi Connelli 
| Female Musical Theatre Performer of the Year
| 
|-
| 2002
| Judi Connelli 
| Supporting Musical Theatrical Performer of the Year
| 
|-

External links

References

Actresses from Brisbane
ARIA Award winners
Australian musical theatre actresses
Australian television actresses
Australian people of Italian descent
Helpmann Award winners
Musicians from Brisbane
1947 births
Living people
Members of the Order of Australia
Australian LGBT singers